Westbury Cricket Club, also known as Westbury Shamrocks is a cricket team which represents Westbury, Tasmania  in the Northern Tasmanian Cricket Association grade cricket competition, in the Australian state of Tasmania.

Honours
NTCA Premierships

See also

Cricket Tasmania
Tasmanian Grade Cricket

References

External links

Tasmanian grade cricket clubs